Estuary Crossing Shuttle was a free bus service in Alameda County, California linking BART with the West End neighborhood of the City of Alameda. Service ended on June 30, 2017.

Service
The commute hour service connected Lake Merritt BART station in Oakland with the island city of Alameda across the Webster and Posey Tubes, vehicle only tunnels separating the cities under a channel known as the Oakland-Alameda Estuary. The nineteen-seater buses carry up to twenty-four passengers. The coaches carry as much as thirteen bicycles, significantly higher than the typical of two passengers per bicycle. Service operates on thirty-minute headways operating runs from 7 AM to 11:30 AM and 3:30 PM to 7 PM Pacific Standard Time. The service is free of charge as it is funded entirely by San Francisco Bay Air Quality Management District grant money. The system began operations on August 15, 2011, with a one-year $236,000 renewable grant. The ECS line also connects the Peralta Community College District campuses of Laney and College of Alameda including the latter's satellite campus on the island's Marina Village.

References

Alameda, California
Transportation in Oakland, California
Bus transportation in California
Zero-fare transport services
Public transportation in the San Francisco Bay Area